The Eternal Jew may refer to

The Eternal Jew (play), 1906 Yiddish-language play by New York-based David Pinski
The Eternal Jew (book), 1937 anti-Semitic book of photographs published by German Nazi Party
The Eternal Jew (art exhibition), 1937 anti-Semitic "degenerate art" museum display in Hitler's Germany
The Eternal Jew (film), anti-Semitic propaganda film in Nazi Germany
The Eternal Jew, 2011 rap album by Oxxxymiron.

See also
Wandering Jew (disambiguation)